Claus E. Heinrich (21 June 1955) is a German manager, entrepreneur, who is an honorary professor for Operations Research at both the Technical University of Berlin and the University of Mannheim and served as board member of SAP between 1996 and 2009. Since 2009 he serves as honorary senator of the Heidelberg University.

Education
Heinrich was born in Waiblingen, Baden-Württemberg, Germany. He studied Operations Research and business administration at the University of Mannheim from 1976 to 1981, where he obtained his Diplom-Kaufmann (the pre-Bologna Process equivalent of a Master's degree). Afterwards, he obtained his Ph.D. in Operations Research and Supply Chain Management in 1986 at the University of Mannheim and was visiting researcher at Cornell University, Ithaca, New York.

Career
He started his career in 1987 and entered the SAP AG in Walldorf, Germany where he quickly earned the responsibility for the R&D area "Logistics Controlling". He became member of the global executive committee of SAP in 1996, where he was for the company's product area of Supply Chain Management. He left SAP in 2009 and founded the Sovanta AG that focus on end-to-end business application solutions and services.

Personal life
Heinrich lives in Heidelberg, is married and father of four children. He is author of several books, including "Adapt or Die - Transforming Your Supply Chain into an Adaptive Business Network" and "RFID and Beyond - Growing Your Business Through Real World Awareness".

See also
 List of University of Mannheim people
 University of Mannheim

Notes

External links
 Biography about Claus E. Heinrich

1955 births
Living people
Operations researchers
People from Waiblingen
Academic staff of the Technical University of Berlin
University of Mannheim alumni
Academic staff of the University of Mannheim
German economists
SAP SE people